Gustav Fredrik Lange (February 22, 1861 – February 11, 1939) was a Norwegian violinist, violin teacher, theory teacher, and composer. During his time, was considered one of Norway's best in his field.

Lange was born in Halden. He was the second concertmaster of the Oslo Philharmonic from its beginning in 1919, and for a time he served as first concertmaster at the Christiania Theatre and National Theatre. With Ole Olsen and Edvard Grieg, he created music for Henrik Ibsen's comedy The League of Youth (premiere at the Swedish Theatre, 1901). Like Ole Olsen, Lange was a Freemason and worked as a conductor and arranger for the Freemasons Orchestra (1921–1936). In Halden he was a member of a chamber quartet together with Oscar Borg (his violin teacher in his youth), Markus Boberg, and the cellist Dupery Hamilton.

Together with Peter Brynie Lindeman, Lange edited the periodical Orkestertidende—blad for musikere og musikervenner (The Orchestra Times: A Paper for Musicians and Their Friends; 1892–1894). Lange was a cofounder of the Oslo Music Teachers Association, the Norwegian Music Teachers' National Federation, and the National Federation of Norwegian Musical Artists. He also taught violin, theory, and harmony at the Oslo Conservatory of Music (1889–1937).

Lange died in Oslo.

Selected students
Prominent students that Gustav Fredrik Lange taught during his career include:
Anne-Marie Ørbeck (1911–1996), pianist and composer
Henrik Adam Due (1891–1966), violinist
Magne Elvestrand (1914–1991), organist
Johan Stanley Simonsen (1904–2003), violinist
Gunnar Knudsen (1907–2003), violinist
Bjarne Brustad (1895–1978), composer
Arild Sandvold (1895–1984), organist
Ludvig Nielsen (1906–2001), composer
Frithjof Spalder (1896–1985), composer
Reidar Thommessen (1889–1986), composer

Awards 
King's Medal of Merit in gold, 1921
Litteris et Artibus, a Swedish royal medal
Ordre des Palmes Académiques, a French national order

Works 
Moderne Violinmusik. Samling af nyere Komponisters Værker udsatte for Violin med Piano (Modern Violin Music. A Collection of Recent Composers' Works Arranged for Violin with Piano, 1896)
Praktisk harmonilære (Practical Harmony, 1897)
Praktisk violinskole I–III (Practical Violin Course 1–3, 1899)
Melodier til Margrethe Munthes Kom, skal vi synge (Melodies to Margrethe Munthe's Come Shall We Sing, 1907)

References

Norwegian violinists
Male violinists
Norwegian composers
Norwegian male composers
Norwegian conductors (music)
Male conductors (music)
People from Halden
Recipients of the King's Medal of Merit in gold
Officiers of the Ordre des Palmes Académiques
1861 births
1939 deaths
Academic staff of the Oslo Conservatory of Music
Litteris et Artibus recipients